is an international competition established by NHK in 1965 to recognize excellence in educational television. As of 2008, the Japan Prize now honors educational videos, movies, websites, games and other interactive audiovisual products along with television content.

References

NHK
Educational television
Awards established in 1965
International awards
Educational media awards